The Museum of Underwater Art (MOUA) is a series of underwater art installations near Townsville, Australia. The museum aims to promote the conservation of the Great Barrier Reef. It is the only underwater art museum in the Southern Hemisphere and consists of three sculptures created by British sculptor Jason deCaires Taylor.

Operation 

The MOUA is managed by MOUA Ltd, a Not For Profit, Donation Gift Recipient company. The Chairman of the MOUA Board is Paul Victory and the Deputy Chair is Dr. Adam Smith.

Funding for MOUA has been provided by Queensland and Australian government and local businesses. MOUA has several permits for facilities and moorings. The annual monitoring plan includes surveys of infrastructure, marine life, social, coral propagation, and marine debris. Reef Ecologic and MOUA initiated a citizen science iNaturalist project of naturalists, citizen scientists, and biologists taking photos and sharing observations of biodiversity of marine species at John Brewer Reef. Participants in this project have recorded over 771 observations of 284 species with the most observed species being the Whitetip reef shark. A scientific paper reported significant increase in fish abundance and diversity, no changes in invertebrate abundance and diversity, and very high satisfaction of tourists. 

The MOUA works closely with government, scientists, tourism operators,  and traditional owners 

The MOUA launched an exhibition called Ocean Sentinels above water at Museum of Tropical Queensland in 2022. This includes eight sculptures of scientists, conservationists and Indigenous people. There has been extensive public consultation and it is proposed that the Ocean Sentinels will be installed as a snorkel trail at Magnetic Island and John Brewer Reef.

Sculptures 

The MOUA has installed three underwater sculptures:

 The Ocean Siren on the Strand Townsville created by Jason deCaires Taylor and installed in December 2019 is made from stainless steel, fibreglass and is a 4m high illuminated sculpture. The Ocean Siren was modelled on Takoda Johnson, a young indigenous girl from the Wulgurukaba tribe reacts to live water temperature data from the Australian Institute of Marine Science Davies Reef weather station on the Great Barrier Reef and changes colour in response to live variations in water temperature.
 The Ocean Sentinels is a series of eight sculptures also by Jason deCaires Taylor. They are modelled on marine scientists and conservationists and are 'a synthesis of human figures and natural marine forms.

Recognition 

In 2022, The Coral Greenhouse was recognised as one of the top 20 tourism destinations in Australia.

In 2022, The Coral Greenhouse was awarded silver in The Australian Street Art Awards: Best Sculpture Trail or Park

References

External links 

Museums in Queensland